The 1950 All-Ireland Senior Hurling Championship was the 64th staging of the All-Ireland hurling championship since its establishment by the Gaelic Athletic Association in 1887. The championship began on 30 April 1950 and ended on 3 September 1950.

Tipperary were the defending champions, and retained their All-Ireland crown following a 1-9 to 1-8 defeat of Kilkenny.

Teams

Team summaries

Results

Leinster Senior Hurling Championship

First round

Quarter-final

Semi-finals

Final

Munster Senior Hurling Championship

Quarter-final

Semi-finals

Final

All-Ireland Senior Hurling Championship

Semi-final

Final

Championship statistics

Top scorers

Overall

In a single game

Scoring

Widest winning margin: 17 points 
Wexford 3-9 - 0-1 Meath (Leinster first round, 30 April 1950)
Most goals in a match: 8 
Laois 1-6 - 7-2 Wexford (Leinster semi-final, 11 June 1950)
Most points in a match: 29 
Tipperary 2-17 - 3-11 Cork (Munster final, 23 July 1950)
Most goals by one team in a match: 7 
Wexford 7-2 - 1-6 Laois (Leinster semi-final, 11 June 1950)
Most goals scored by a losing team: 3 
Westmeath 3-2 - 3-3 Offaly (Leinster first round, 30 April 1950)
Clare 3-7 - 2-13 Tipperary (Munster semi-final, 9 July 1950)
Cork 3-11 - 2-17 Tipperary (Munster final, 23 July 1950)
Most points scored by a losing team: 11 
Wexford 2-11 - 3-11 Kilkenny (Leinster final, 16 July 1950)
Cork 3-11 - 2-17 Tipperary (Munster final, 23 July 1950)

Miscellaneous

 For the first time since 1942 there were no representatives from Ulster in the All-Ireland series.

Sources

 Corry, Eoghan, The GAA Book of Lists (Hodder Headline Ireland, 2005).
 Donegan, Des, The Complete Handbook of Gaelic Games (DBA Publications Limited, 2005).
 Sweeney, Éamonn, Munster Hurling Legends (The O'Brien Press, 2002).

External links
 1950 All-Ireland Hurling Championship results

References

1950